Jitka Traplová is a Czechoslovak retired slalom canoeist who competed in the late 1960s. She won gold medals in the mixed C-2 event and the mixed C-2 team event at the 1969 ICF Canoe Slalom World Championships in Bourg St.-Maurice.

References

Czechoslovak female canoeists
Possibly living people
Year of birth missing (living people)
Medalists at the ICF Canoe Slalom World Championships